Sleepy Hollow High is a 2000 American horror film directed by Chris Arth and Kevin Summerfield.

Plot
Five delinquent classmates must perform community service at Sleepy Hollow Park Grounds, a place notorious for vandalism and for many unsolved disappearances. As the afternoon unfolds, the students begin to realize that someone is taking the Legend of Sleepy Hollow too far, and that everyone is a suspect—from the teachers and counselors of Sleepy Hollow High to their classmates and each other. It is even possible that the legend itself is true. In the end, none of it matters because it was all a dream.

Cast 
Meagan Lopez as Shannon
Ruben Brown as 'Z'
Antonio Benedict as Pumpkin Man
Wendy Donigian as Diana Palmer
Matt Evers as Jay
Maria Cooper as Bobbi
Kevin Summerfield as Mr. E
Darryl Lozupone as Justin
Adrienne Townes as Jogger
Lee Wilkinson as Mr. Allen
George Stover as Mr. Breezo
Benjamin Bagaria as Happy Halloween Student
Amanda Lopez as Foxy Student
Terrence J. Arth as Happy Pumpkin Student / Z's Classroom Buddy / Monster Hands
Brandon Rhoten as Halloween Kid
Anthony Rhoten as Halloween Kid 2
Taylor Kuhns as Halloween Kid 3
Bluto Q. Kaminsky as NYPD Cop
Chris Arth as Voice of American DJ
Josh Petroski as Cupcake Student
Jessica Asch as Student
Matthew Brookman as Student
Kim Gough as Student
Shira Katz as Student
Antony Liberato as Student
JoAnn Martin as Student
Josh McCintock as Student
Jonas Mitchell as Student
Brandon Price as Student
Dan Wergand as Student

External links

 

2000 films
2000 horror films
American slasher films
Films shot in Maryland
Supernatural slasher films
Halloween horror films
2000s English-language films
2000s American films